Shangrao Normal University (SNU) is a teacher's college in Shangrao, Jiangxi, China.

History
In 1958 the university was established as Shangrao Normal Junior College. The following year the name was changed to Gan Dong Bei University (S: 赣东北大学, T: 灨東北大學, P: Gàn Dōngběi Dàxué "Northeastern Jiangxi University"). The university closed during the Cultural Revolution and reopened in 1978. In March 2000 the name of the university changed to its current name after the Jiangxi provincial government and the Ministry of Education approved of the change.

Demographics
As of 2014 has 14,405 full-time students and 1,561 adult education students. The full-time students originate from 30 provinces.

As of 2014 there are 979 employees, including faculty and staff, at Shangrao Normal University.

References

External links
  Shangrao Normal University
  "历史沿革." (Chinese-language page on the history)

Universities and colleges in Jiangxi
Teachers colleges in China
Shangrao
Educational institutions established in 1958
1958 establishments in China